The Dawson Creek Kodiaks were a Junior ice hockey team from Dawson Creek, British Columbia, Canada.  They are former members of the Peace-Cariboo Junior Hockey League.

History
The Dawson Creek Canucks were members of the Peace Junior B Hockey League.  In 1975, the league expanded and became the Peace-Cariboo Junior B Hockey League.

In 1980, the Canucks became the Kodiaks and the league was promoted to Junior A.  The Kodiaks stayed with the league until 1990 when they folded for the second time in three seasons.  Their best season was 1982-83 when they finished second in the league with 24 wins in 40 games.  They lost the PCJHL Cup league final 4-games-to-1 to the Williams Lake Mustangs.

The Kodiaks changed their name to the Dawson Creek Capitals in the 1985-1986 season. The Capitals eventually folded and were replaced in 1994 by the Dawson Creek Jr. Canucks in the North West Junior Hockey League.  The Kodiaks were replaced at the Junior A level in 2010 by the Dawson Creek Rage of the North American Hockey League.

Season-by-season standings

Playoffs
1981 Lost Semi-final
Prince George Spruce Kings defeated Dawson Creek Kodiaks 4-games-to-2
1982 Lost Semi-final
Grande Prairie North Stars defeated Dawson Creek Kodiaks 4-games-to-none
1983 Lost Final
Williams Lake Mustangs defeated Dawson Creek Kodiaks 3-games-to-1
Dawson Creek Canucks defeated Prince George Spruce Kings 3-games-to-2
Williams Lake Mustangs defeated Dawson Creek Kodiaks 4-games-to-1
1984 DNQ
1985 DNQ
1986 DNQ
1987 DNQ
1988 Did Not Finish Season
1989 DNQ
1990 Did Not Finish Season

External links
BC Hockey

Ice hockey teams in British Columbia
Dawson Creek
1990 disestablishments in British Columbia
Ice hockey clubs disestablished in 1990